Explosion welding (EXW) is a solid state (solid-phase) process where welding is accomplished by accelerating one of the components at extremely high velocity through the use of chemical explosives.  This process is often used to clad carbon steel or aluminium plate with a thin layer of a harder or more corrosion-resistant material (e.g., stainless steel, nickel alloy, titanium, or zirconium). Due to the nature of this process, producible geometries are very limited. Typical geometries produced include plates, tubing and tube sheets.

Development 
Unlike other forms of welding such as arc welding (which was developed in the late 19th century), explosion welding was developed relatively recently, in the decades after World War II. Its origins, however, go back to World War I, when it was observed that pieces of shrapnel sticking to armor plating were not only embedding themselves, but were actually being welded to the metal. Since the extreme heat involved in other forms of welding did not play a role, it was concluded that the phenomenon was caused by the explosive forces acting on the shrapnel.  These results were later duplicated in laboratory tests and, not long afterwards, the process was patented and put to use.

In 1962, DuPont applied for a patent on the explosion welding process, which was granted on June 23, 1964 under US Patent 3,137,937  and resulted in the use of the Detaclad trademark to describe the process. On July 22, 1996, Dynamic Materials Corporation completed the acquisition of DuPont's Detaclad operations for a purchase price of $5,321,850 (or about $ million today).

The response of inhomogeneous plates undergoing explosive welding was analytically modeled in 2011.

Advantages and disadvantages
Explosion welding can produce a bond between two metals that cannot necessarily be welded by conventional means. The process does not melt either metal, instead plasticizing the surfaces of both metals, causing them to come into intimate contact sufficient to create a weld. This is a similar principle to other non-fusion welding techniques, such as friction welding. Large areas can be bonded extremely quickly and the weld itself is very clean, due to the fact that the surface material of both metals is violently expelled during the reaction.

Explosion welding can join a wide array of compatible and non-compatible metals, with more than 260 metal combinations possible.

A disadvantage of this method is that extensive knowledge of explosives is needed before the procedure may be attempted safely. Regulations for the use of high explosives may require special licensing.

See also
Magnetic pulse welding

References

Further reading

 L.R. Carl. (1944). "Brass welds made by detonation impulse". Metal Progress 102-103 46 - brief publication on the explosion welding of metallic plates. 
 US patent 3,137,937 G. R. Cowan, J. Douglas, and A. Holtzman, (1960). "Explosive bonding" -  published a patent on the explosive welding process

Welding
Explosions